Newton Country Day School of the Sacred Heart (often abbreviated to Newton Country Day School, Newton, or NCDS) is a private, all-girls Roman Catholic high school and middle school located on the Loren Towle Estate in Newton, Massachusetts, as part of  the Sacred Heart Network of 21 schools in the United States and 44 countries abroad.

History
Newton Country Day School was founded in 1880 as the Boston Academy of the Sacred Heart. It was the twentieth Sacred Heart School to open in the United States, and is a member of the international Network of Sacred Heart Schools, which spans forty-four countries and twenty-one cities in the United States. All Sacred Heart schools are associated with and live by the values of the Society of the Sacred Heart, founded by Saint Philippine Duchesne and Saint Madeleine Sophie in 1800 in Paris. Philippine brought the schools over to America in 1818.

The school was first located at 5 Chester Square in Boston's South End (now the corner of Massachusetts Avenue and Washington Street), and subsequently in four Back Bay brownstones at 260-266 Commonwealth Avenue. In December 1925 it moved to the Loren Towle Estate in Newton, where the architectural firm of Maginnis and Walsh added a chapel and a four-story school wing completed in 1928. In 1960 a gymnasium/auditorium was finished, with further additions of the Sweeney Husson building in 2002 (housing a theatre, state-of-the-art science labs, and an enlarged Middle School) and 2007 a new and greatly enlarged library.

Notable alumnae
Niia Bertino '05, musician, featured on Wyclef Jean's 2007 top 20 single, "Sweetest Girl (Dollar Bill)"
Rose Kennedy, philanthropist and socialite
Kelly Timilty (1962-2012), Massachusetts politician
Sarah Van Patten, principal dancer, San Francisco Ballet
Jane Curtin, actress and comedienne

Notes and references

External links
 School Website

Girls' schools in Massachusetts
Catholic secondary schools in Massachusetts
Schools in Middlesex County, Massachusetts
Educational institutions established in 1880
Sacred Heart schools in the United States
Private middle schools in Massachusetts
Private elementary schools in Massachusetts
1880 establishments in Massachusetts